Klaus-Dieter Matz (born 16 August 1932 in Rostock) is an East German handballer who competed for the SC Dynamo Berlin. He won two times the  Outdoor World Championships (1959 and 1963) and a bronze medal at the 1958 Indoor World Championship.

References 

1932 births
East German male handball players
Living people
People from Rostock